The 1949 Tulane Green Wave football team represented Tulane University as a member of the Southeastern Conference (SEC) during the 1949 college football season. Led by fourth-year head coach Henry Frnka, the Green Wave played their home games at Tulane Stadium in New Orleans. Tulane finished the season with an overall record of 7–2–1 and a mark of 5–1 in conference play, winning the SEC title.

Schedule

References

Tulane
Tulane Green Wave football seasons
Southeastern Conference football champion seasons
Tulane Green Wave football